The Quartet That Split Up (Swedish: Kvartetten som sprängdes) is a 1936 Swedish comedy film directed by Arne Bornebusch and starring Carl Barcklind, Birgit Rosengren and Aino Taube. It is an adaptation of the 1924 novel of the same title by Birger Sjöberg, which was late remade as a 1950 film. The film's sets were designed by the art directors Bibi Lindström and Max Linder. It was shot at the Sundbyberg Studios of Europa Film in Stockholm.

Synopsis
The members of a string quartet in a small Swedish town decided to speculate on the stock market with unexpected results.

Cast
 Carl Barcklind as Karl Ludvig Sundelin
 Birgit Rosengren as 	Maj Andersson
 Nils Lundell as 	Anders Åvik
 Olga Andersson as 	Mrs. Selma Åvik
 Aino Taube as 	Märta Åvik
 Helle Winther as 	Edmund Åvik
 Sture Baude as Borg
 Åke Engfeldt as 	Ture Borg
 Helge Hagerman as 	Bengt 'Cello' Erlandsson
 Ivar Kåge as 	Teodor Planertz
 Dagmar Ebbesen as 	Aunt Klara

References

Bibliography 
 Goble, Alan. The Complete Index to Literary Sources in Film. Walter de Gruyter, 1999.
 Krawc, Alfred. International Directory of Cinematographers, Set- and Costume Designers in Film: Denmark, Finland, Norway, Sweden (from the beginnings to 1984). Saur, 1986.
 Wredlund, Bertil & Lindfors, Rolf. Långfilm i Sverige: 1930-1939. Proprius, 1983.

External links 
 

1936 films
Swedish comedy films
1936 comedy films
1930s Swedish-language films
Films directed by Arne Bornebusch
Swedish black-and-white films
Films based on Swedish novels
1930s Swedish films